Hoofdletters, Tweeling- en Meerlingdruk was a Dutch book published in 1958. In the book, author Dr. George van den Bergh made several propositions for a more economical arrangement of type in books. The book was featured in Herbert Spencer's Typographica (Old Series, number 16, 1959) in and Eye magazine (no. 47, vol. 12, Spring 2003).  In Rick Poynor's Typographica he translates the Dutch title as "Capitals, twin- and multi-print."

There were three principles in van den Bergh's proposals. The first was that printing in all caps (Hoofdletters in Dutch means uppercase letters) would save the space wasted by the ascenders and descenders of lowercase letters. The second principle involved double printing texts that could be screened by overlaying sheets that masked every other line of text. The third principle involved double printing texts in red and green: the reader could then read through red or green "spectacles" that filtered out one text.

Erik Kindel, author of the 2003 Eye article sums up with a contemporary evaluation of the book:

Notes

1958 non-fiction books
Communication design
Dutch non-fiction books
Graphic design